Cervatto is a comune (municipality) in the Province of Vercelli in the Italian region Piedmont, located about  northeast of Turin and about  northwest of Vercelli.

Cervatto borders the following municipalities: Cravagliana, Fobello, and Rossa.

Demographic evolution

References

Cities and towns in Piedmont